Anand Junction (station code: ANND) is a major junction located in Anand, Gujarat. It is a junction on the railway line which connects Ahmedabad with Vadodara and Mumbai and was opened in 1901.

Other broad-gauge branches from Anand connect it to Godhra and Cambay.

In 2011, Indian Railways announced its intention to set up "multi-function complex" including budget hotels at Anand railway station.

Trains

Some MEMU and DEMU trains which originate and terminates here are:

 Anand-Ahmedabad MEMU
 Anand-Bharuch MEMU
 Anand-Gandhinagar MEMU
 Anand-Godhra MEMU
 Anand-Dahod MEMU
 Anand-Dakor MEMU
 Anand-Khambhat DEMU
 Anand-Vadtal MEMU

Some of the important trains that pass through Anand Junction are:

 22945/46 Saurashtra Mail
 22955/56 Kutch Express
 19217/18 Bandra Terminus–Jamnagar Saurashtra Janta Express
 12971/72 Bandra Terminus–Bhavnagar Terminus Express
 12833/84 Howrah–Ahmedabad Superfast Express
 22137/38 Prerana Express
 19167/68 Sabarmati Express
 19165/66 Ahmedabad–Darbhanga Sabarmati Express
 22927/28 Lok Shakti Express
 19707/08 Amrapur Aravali Express
 22923/24 Bandra Terminus–Jamnagar Humsafar Express
 12947/48 Azimabad Express
 12917/18 Gujarat Sampark Kranti Express
 12479/80 Suryanagri Express
 12901/02 Gujarat Mail
 12933/34 Karnavati Express
 12843/44 Puri–Ahmedabad Express
 12989/90 Dadar–Ajmer Superfast Express
 11463/64 Somnath–Jabalpur Express (via Itarsi)
 11465/66 Somnath–Jabalpur Express (via Bina)
 19115/16 Sayajinagari Express
 12931/32 Mumbai Central–Ahmedabad Double Decker Express
 19309/10 Shanti Express
 19215/16 Saurashtra Express
 22953/54 Gujarat Superfast Express
 19033/34 Gujarat Queen
 12655/56 Navjeevan Express
 12949/50 Kavi Guru Express
 17017/18 Rajkot–Secunderabad Express
 12009/10 Mumbai Central–Ahmedabad Shatabdi Express
 12473/74 Gandhidham–Shri Mata Vaishno Devi Katra Sarvodaya Express
 22959/60 Surat–Jamnagar Intercity Express
 19035/36 Vadodara–Ahmedabad Intercity Express
 11095/96 Ahimsa Express
 14707/08 Ranakpur Express
 16337/38 Ernakulam–Okha Express
 16587/88 Yesvantpur – Bikaner Express
 22451/52 Chandigarh–Bandra Terminus Superfast Express
 19419/20 Chennai Central−Ahmedabad Express
 16209/10 Mysore–Ajmer Express
 16507/08 Jodhpur–Bangalore City Express (via Hubballi)
 12489/90 Bikaner–Dadar Superfast Express
 12959/60 Dadar–Bhuj Superfast Express

References

Railway stations in Anand district
Vadodara railway division
Railway junction stations in Gujarat
Railway stations opened in 1901